Aquashow was the 1973 debut album by singer-songwriter Elliott Murphy. It was reviewed by Paul Nelson in 'Rolling Stone along with Bruce Springsteen's The Wild, the Innocent and the E Street Shuffle under the headline "He's the Best Dylan since 1968", which earned both artists the "New Dylan" tag. When Aquashow was released on CD in 1988 it was reviewed by Robert Hilburn in the Los Angeles Times under the headline "A Compelling Aquashow", and in 2006, thirty-three years after the original release, the album was called an "Album Classic" in a full-page review in UNCUT magazine.

Track listing
All tracks composed by Elliott Murphy

"Last of The Rock Stars"
"How's The Family"
"Hangin' Out"
"Hometown"
"Graveyard Scrapbook"
"Poise 'N Pen"
"Marilyn"
"White Middle Class Blues"
"Like a Great Gatsby" (listed as "Like a Crystal Microphone" in the US edition to avoid violating copyrights on the novel)
"Don't Go Away"

Personnel
Elliott Murphy – vocals, guitar, harmonica, piano, backing vocals
Gene Parsons – drums, backing vocals
Tasha Thomas – backing vocals
Dennis Ferrante – backing vocals
Teddy Irwin – acoustic guitar
Jim Mason – backing vocals
Eddie Mottau – backing vocals
Linda November – backing vocals
Frank Owens – piano, organ
Pat Rebillot – piano and organ on "Hangin' Out", "Marilyn" and "Like a Crystal Microphone"
Maeretha Stewart – backing vocals
Dick Wagner – backing vocals
Matthew Murphy – bass, backing vocals
Rick Marotta – drums on "How's The Family"
Technical
Shelly Yakus – recording engineer
Ed Sprigg, Rod O'Brien - tape operator 
Paula Bisacca – artwork
Jack Mitchell – photography

References

1973 debut albums
Albums recorded at Record Plant (New York City)
Elliott Murphy albums
Polydor Records albums